Onda (written: 恩田) is a Japanese surname. Notable people with the surname include:

, Japanese writer
, Japanese figure skater
, Japanese skier

Japanese-language surnames